Nadhmi A. Al-Nasr is the CEO of NEOM project and is the former Executive Vice-President for Administration and Finance at King Abdullah University of Science and Technology and had held this office since 2008. 
He was born in 1956 in Saihat. He was the interim president of the institution in 2006 when the university was still in infancy.

Education
In 1978, he obtained a B.S. in Chemical Engineering from KFUPM in Dhahran, Saudi Arabia.

Career
He joined Saudi Aramco in 1978. In 1991, he managed the massive expansion program in the Ghawar oilfield, to fill the production gap caused by the loss of oil output from Iraq and Kuwait during the Gulf War.

Later he held many managerial positions including the management of Shaybah Development Project.

He spent the last 13 years of his career working with international engineering and consulting firms in the US, UK, Netherlands, and Japan.

In March 2006, he was named vice president of Engineering Services at Saudi Aramco. He assumed this position in April 2006.

In August 2018, he was appointed CEO of NEOM project.

2020 real estate power list 
Nadhmi Al-Nasr was featured in Cityscape Intelligence's most influential people in the MENA real estate industry.

References

External links
 Bio at KAUST Site.
 Speakers Profile IEEE GCC Conference % Exhibition Towards.

Living people
Saudi Aramco
King Fahd University of Petroleum and Minerals alumni
People from Qatif
1956 births